Transpac  may refer to:

 Transpacific Yacht Race
 Transpac 52, sailing yacht
 The original name of Air Caledonie
 Transpac (cable system), one of a series of Pacific Ocean submarine communications cables
 Transpac (network), packet-switched network of the late 1970s
 TransPAC2, part of the NSF’s International Research Network Connections (IRNC) program